Lubero Territory is a territory in North Kivu, Democratic Republic of the Congo.

Internally displaced persons 
On 10 June, 2014, the administrator of Lubero Territory, Joy Bokele, requested assistance for six hundred displaced households who sought refuge two months ago in the south of the territory. These people come from Walikale where they fled clashes between FDLR militia and Nduma défense of Congo (NDC) (NDC) Cheka. These internally displaced persons (IDPs) are grouped in several sites, including Kasuho, Bunyantenge and Njiapanda.

References

Territories of North Kivu Province
Democratic Republic of the Congo refugees